Laniyari (also Romanized as Lānīyārī and Lenīārī; also known as Lāynārī) is a village in Pir Sohrab Rural District, in the Central District of Chabahar County, Sistan and Baluchestan Province, Iran. At the 2006 census, its population was 315, in 55 families.

References 

Populated places in Chabahar County